Chinateenarla is a village in Nakkapalli block, Anakapalli district, Andhra Pradesh, India with about 300 households.

References

Villages in Anakapalli district